Behran Alavi (born April 17, 1980) is an Iranian actor. He has received various accolades, including nominations for a Crystal Simorgh and a Hafez Award.

Early life 
Behrang was born on 1 April 1980 in Azadi Hospital in Tehran. He is the only child of a family of three. His father is a retired cultural director and his mother is a telecom director. He is single and has a diploma in computer drawing. He is also an acting graduate of the first graduate course of Karnameh Cultural-Artistic Institute.

Filmography

Film

Web

Awards and nominations 
Candidate for the supporting role of a male actor in 31st Fajr Film Festival for the film "Darband (film) | Darband" directed by Parviz Shahbazi, 2012
Received an honorary diploma for male acting from 34th Fajr Theater Festival for the play "Original Language" directed by Rasoul Kahani, 2015
Acting candidate for the series Eight and a half minutes directed by Shahram Shah Hosseini in Image World Festival, 2016

References

External links 
  behrag alavi on soureh cinema 
 
  *

1980 births
Living people
Iranian pop musicians
Iranian male film actors
Male actors from Tehran
Iranian male television actors
21st-century Iranian male actors